Bárbara Andrea Franco Solana Borges (born April 4, 1974) is a former competition swimmer who represented Spain at two consecutive Summer Olympics.

Early years 

Franco was born in Madrid. She is the older sister of Olympic swimmer Claudia Franco. Both sisters attended Mission Viejo High School in Mission Viejo, California, where they swam for the Mission Viejo high school swim team.

College career 

Franco attended the University of Florida in Gainesville, Florida, where she swam for the Florida Gators swimming and diving team in National Collegiate Athletic Association (NCAA) competition from 1992 to 1996. During her four-year college career, she received four All-America honors and won two individual Southeastern Conference (SEC) championships in the 200-meter butterfly event.

International career 

At the 1992 Summer Olympics in Barcelona, Spain, Franco competed in the women's 100-meter butterfly and finished twenty-sixth. She won the gold medal in the 200-meter butterfly at the European Short Course Swimming Championships 1996 in Rostock, Germany. At the 1996 Summer Olympics in Atlanta, Georgia, she was again a member of the Spanish Olympic team, and finished sixteenth in the 200-meter butterfly.

Personal 

Franco is married to Brazilian swimmer Gustavo Borges, who she met in 1992 and started dating four years later prior to the Olympics. Franco has since moved to São Paulo, where she is a teacher in an international school and lives with her two children, both of whom have started swimming for Esporte Clube Pinheiros.

See also 

 List of University of Florida alumni
 List of University of Florida Olympians

References 

1974 births
Living people
European Aquatics Championships medalists in swimming
Spanish female butterfly swimmers
Florida Gators women's swimmers
Olympic swimmers of Spain
Swimmers from Madrid
Spanish expatriate sportspeople in Brazil
Swimmers at the 1992 Summer Olympics
Swimmers at the 1996 Summer Olympics
Mediterranean Games silver medalists for Spain
Mediterranean Games bronze medalists for Spain
Mediterranean Games medalists in swimming
Swimmers at the 1991 Mediterranean Games